White's Cove is a cove in Yarmouth, Maine, United States. It sits directly north of the Ellis C. Snodgrass Memorial Bridge. Whites Cove Road, off Gilman Road, leads to the cove.

History 
The cove is named for Nicholas White, who arrived in 1667. It was once the home of Captain Frank L. Oakes.

References 

Coves of the United States
Bays of Maine
Landforms of Yarmouth, Maine